Tin Yiu Estate is a public housing estate in Tin Shui Wai, New Territories, Hong Kong, near Light Rail Tin Yiu stop, Tin Tsz stop and Tin Shui Wai stop as well as MTR Tin Shui Wai station. It is the first public housing estate in Tin Shui Wai New Town. It is divided into Tin Yiu (I) Estate and Tin Yiu (II) Estate, and consists of 12 residential buildings completed in 1992 and 1993.

Tin Yau Court is a Home Ownership Scheme court in Tin Shui Wai, near Tin Yiu Estate. It consists of three blocks built in 1992.

Houses

Tin Yiu (I) Estate

Tin Yiu (II) Estate

Tin Yau Court

Demographics
According to the 2016 by-census, Tin Yiu Estate had a population of 24,929 while Tin Yau Court had a population of 5,090. Altogether the population amounts to 30,019.

Politics
For the 2019 District Council election, the estate fell within three constituencies. Tin Yiu (I) Estate is located in the Tin Yiu constituency, which is represented by Ben Ho Wai-pan, Tin Yiu (II) Estate and Tin Yau Court are located in the Yiu Yau constituency, which is represented by Ng Hin-wang, while part of Tin Yau Court falls within the Tsz Yau constituency, which is represented by May Chan Mei-lin.

See also

Public housing estates in Tin Shui Wai

References

Tin Shui Wai
Public housing estates in Hong Kong
Residential buildings completed in 1992
Residential buildings completed in 1993